Oligia violacea is a species of cutworm or dart moth in the family Noctuidae. It is found in North America.

The MONA or Hodges number for Oligia violacea is 9414.

References

Further reading

 
 
 

Oligia
Articles created by Qbugbot
Moths described in 1881